Benedicte Christine Adrian Mouton (born 22 October 1963) is a Norwegian singer and artist. She has released material on her own, but is best known for her collaboration with Ingrid Bjørnov in the pop duo Dollie de Luxe (1980–1994). She has also distinguished herself as a solo artist for several years, with the role as "Queen of the Night" in Mozart's The Magic Flute at the Norwegian Opera. She has since sung with Bergen Oratoriekor and Bergen Philharmonic Orchestra, in addition to having participated in works like Dido and Aeneas, Peer Gynt and Olav Engelbrektsson.

In the fall of 2007, Adrian was to be seen on the TV screen as a judge on the fifth season of TV2's popular talent show Pop Idol.

Discography

Albums
 1980: Dollie De Luxe: Første akt - vocals - #3 in Norway
 1981: Dollie De Luxe: Dollies dagbok - vocals - #10 in Norway
 1982: Dollie De Luxe: First Act - vocals
 1982: Dollie De Luxe: Rampelys - vocals - #36 in Norway
 1984: Dollie De Luxe: Dollie De Luxe - vocals
 1984: Dollie De Luxe: Queen of the Night / Satisfaction (single) - vocals
 1985: Dollie De Luxe: Rock vs. Opera - vocals - #7 in Norway
 1985: United Artists: Sammen for livet - vocals on tracks 1 and 11
 1987: Dollie De Luxe: Which Witch - vocals
 1995: Dollie De Luxe: Prinsessens Utvalgte - vocals
 1999: Benedicte Adrian, Ingrid Bjørnov: Adrian / Bjørnov - vocals
 2001 Sølvguttene: Sølvguttene synger julen inn- soloist
 2004 Seppo: Retrofeelia - vocals
 2008: Desember (album) - vocals - #31 in Norway

References

External links 
 Backstage Management's presentation of Benedicte Adrian
 About Benedicte Adrian in the article Dollie de Luxe from Norsk pop og rock leksikon from 2005 (Norwegian)

Living people
1963 births
Norwegian women singers
Eurovision Song Contest entrants of 1984
Eurovision Song Contest entrants for Norway